Ednei Barbosa de Souza (born 5 July 1990), known as Ednei, is a Brazilian footballer who plays for Ponte Preta as a defender.

Career statistics

References

External links

1990 births
Living people
Brazilian footballers
Association football defenders
Campeonato Brasileiro Série A players
Campeonato Brasileiro Série B players
Campeonato Brasileiro Série C players
Esporte Clube Vitória players
Clube Atlético Linense players
Clube Atlético Bragantino players